Melica brasiliana, is a grass species in the family Poaceae that is endemic to Brazil and southern South America.

Description
The species is perennial with elongated rhizomes. Culm-internodes scaberulous with leaf-sheaths are tubular with one of their length being closed. They are also erect and connate. They also have scabrous margins with apex. Fertile spikelets have hairy, pubescent, curved and filiformed pedicels. Florets are diminished with callus being pubescent as well. The species have a smooth rachilla.

It also has a pilose and scaberulous surface. Both the lower and upper glumes are keelless and chartaceous, but have different apexes. The upper glume apex is obtuse while the lower glumes is acute. They also have purple coloured hyaline margins. Palea have ciliolate keels.

References

brasiliana
Endemic flora of Brazil